The men's light middleweight (71 kg/156.2 lbs) Low-Kick division at the W.A.K.O. European Championships 2004 in Budva was the sixth heaviest of the male Low-Kick tournaments and involved eight fighters.  Each of the matches was three rounds of two minutes each and were fought under Low-Kick kickboxing rules.

The tournament gold medal was won by future K-1 MAX fighter and pro world champion Michał Głogowski from Poland who defeated Andrey Borodulin from Belarus in the final by unanimous decision.  Semi finalists Ile Risteski from Macedonia and Khizri Saipov from Russia received bronze medals.

Results

Key

See also
List of WAKO Amateur European Championships
List of WAKO Amateur World Championships
List of male kickboxers

References

External links
 WAKO World Association of Kickboxing Organizations Official Site

W.A.K.O. European Championships 2004 (Budva)